Naveen Patnaik was elected as Chief Minister of Odisha fifth time in 2019. The ministry is informally known as Naveen 5.O. Here is the list of his ministry:

Council Of Ministers

29 May 2019 to 4 June 2022

5 June 2022 - Till Date 
Entire cabinet was reshuffled on 5 June 2022. All ministers of previous cabinet resigned on 4 June 2022. Odisha Governor Ganeshi Lal administered the oath to the new ministers. Thirteen ministers were sworn in with Cabinet rank while eight were inducted as ministers of state. Nine ministers of the previous cabinet were retained. In a first, five women joined the ministry.

References

Lists of current Indian state and territorial ministries
Biju Janata Dal
Odisha ministries
Cabinets established in 2019
2019 establishments in Odisha